Greatest Hits is a B2K album released in 2004.

Tracks listing

 Bump, Bump, Bump (with P.Diddy) - 4:44
 Gots ta Be - 5:22
 Girlfriend (Pied Piper Remix) - 2:56
 Bump That - 3:15
 What a Girl Wants - 4:38
 Why I Love You - 4:01
 Girlfriend - 3:25
 Baby Girl - 4:50
 Uh Huh - 3:44
 Everything - 3:57